Maria Antonelli (1903–1969) was an Italian fashion designer. A pioneer of Italian fashion design, Antonelli took part in the first Italian fashion shows.

Early life
Maria Antonelli was born in 1903. She was apprenticed at Battilocchi Tailoring in Rome.

Career
Antonelli founded her eponymous fashion house in 1930. In July 1951, together with other designers such as Vincenzo Ferdinandi, Roberto Capucci, the Atelier Carosa, Giovannelli-Sciarra, Polinober, Germana Marucelli and Jole Veneziani, she took part in the show organised by Giovanni Battista Giorgini in Florence that attempted to establish Italian fashion as a rival to France. Her designs have been described as having "minimalist silhouettes which pre-empted the 60s trend". She dressed the actresses Clara Calamai, Anna Magnani, and Alida Valli. In 1969, she took part in the Mare Moda festival, where her models were described by Antony King-Deacon of The Times as "thrashing about with their arms and legs in a sort of frenzied apathy. On they ran, harem-scarem, wiggle, scream, and they were gone."

Death and legacy
Antonelli died in 1969. Her designs featured in the Victoria & Albert Museum's exhibition The Glamour of Italian Fashion 1945-2014 in 2014.

References

External links 
 https://www.flickr.com/photos/skorver1/sets/72157633172868323/
 Made in Italy: alta moda - Rai Teche. 1959

1903 births
1969 deaths
Fashion designers from Rome
Italian fashion designers
Italian women fashion designers
20th-century Italian businesswomen
20th-century Italian businesspeople